Robert van Oosterom (born 16 October 1968) is a former Dutch cricketer. He is a right-handed batsman and bowler. He usually occupies the middle order.

He began playing for the Netherlands in 1990, in the ICC Trophy match against Israel. However, he has not made the national team since 2002.

Sources

1968 births
Living people
Dutch cricketers
Netherlands One Day International cricketers
Sportspeople from The Hague